Petr Vašek (born 9 April 1979) is a Czech former football goalkeeper.

Vašek played for several Gambrinus liga clubs before joining 1. FC Slovácko in 2009. He won the Czech Cup with Baník Ostrava in 2005.

References

External links
 Profile at iDNES.cz
 Profile at 1. FC Slovácko website

1979 births
People from Frýdek-Místek District
Sportspeople from the Moravian-Silesian Region
Living people
Czech footballers
Association football goalkeepers
SFC Opava players
FC Baník Ostrava players
SK Kladno players
1. FC Slovácko players
FC Sibir Novosibirsk players
FK Ústí nad Labem players
FC Tom Tomsk players
Czech First League players
Czech National Football League players
Russian Premier League players
Russian First League players
Czech expatriate footballers
Expatriate footballers in Russia
Czech expatriate sportspeople in Russia